Henry Patten (born 6 May 1996) is a British tennis player.

Patten has a career high ATP singles ranking of 462 achieved on 19 September 2022. He also has a career high doubles ranking of 64 achieved on 9 January 2023.

Patten has won ten ATP Challenger doubles titles, all in 2022 with Julian Cash.

Personal
From Manningtree, Patten was educated at Ipswich School and Culford School. He played college tennis at UNC Asheville (2015–2019) and as a postgraduate at Durham University (2019–2020).

Patten is also a chess enthusiast, often playing the game while on tour.

Career

College
While at UNC Asheville Patten became the No. 1 ranked NCAA doubles player and placed as high as No. 32 in singles. In 2018 he was the first player in the history of his program to be selected for the singles draw of the NCAA Men's Tennis Championships. At Durham he finished runner-up with Josep  Krstanovic to fellow Durham students Julius Tverijonas and Or Ram-Harel in the 2019 BUCS Men's Doubles Championship.

Doubles performance timeline

Current through the 2023 Australian Open.

ATP Challenger and ITF World Tennis Tour finals

Singles: 4 (1–3)

Doubles: 22 (18 titles, 4 runner-ups)

References

External links
 
 

1996 births
Living people
British male tennis players
Sportspeople from Colchester
UNC Asheville Bulldogs men's tennis players
People educated at Culford School
People educated at Ipswich School
Alumni of Durham University
English male tennis players
Tennis people from Essex